The Neil Kerley Medal (formerly known as the Trabilsie Medal and later the Steve Hamra Medal) is an Australian rules football award given to the player(s) from the West Adelaide Football Club deemed Best & Fairest for the season. West Adelaide play in the South Australian National Football League.

In 2015, the WAFC board approved the change of the naming of the Best and Fairest Medallion as the Neil Kerley Medal to honour four time club B&F and two time premiership winner as a player and coach, Neil Kerley.

Recipients:
 2019 Logan Hill & Thomas Keough
 2020 Isaac Johnson
 2019 Logan Hill
 2018 Kaine Stevens
 2017 Kaine Stevens
 2016 Chris Schmidt
 2015 Jason Porplyzia
 2014 Jonathon Beech
 2013 Ryan Ferguson and Chris Schmidt
 2012 Ryan Ferguson
 2011 Steven Morris
 2010 Daniel Caire
 2009 Ryan Ferguson
 2008 Ryan Ferguson
 2007 Simon McCormick
 2006 Ben Haynes
 2005 Jason Porplyzia
 2004 Luke Norman
 2003 Darren Bradshaw
 2002 Chris Chubb
 2001 Ben Hollands
 2000 Dion Myles
 1999 Tim Symes
 1998 Adam Richardson
 1997 Anthony Banik
 1996 Brooke Fogden
 1995 Anthony Banik
 1994 Jamie Andriske
 1993 Mark Mickan
 1992 Leon Grosser
 1991 Peter Banfield
 1990 Grantley Fielke
 1989 Neville Shaw
 1988 Neville Shaw
 1987 Kieran Sporn
 1986 Mark Mickan
 1985 Mark Mickan
 1984 Des Herbert
 1983 Mark Mickan
 1982 Ian Borchard
 1981 John Kantilaftas
 1980 Ian Borchard
 1979 Michael Gregg
 1978 Dexter Kennedy
 1977 Trevor Grimwood (Magarey Medal winner)
 1976 Trevor Grimwood
 1975 Bob Loveday
 1974 Bob Loveday
 1973 Bob Keddie
 1972 Greg Nicholson
 1971 Simon Fraser
 1970 Robert Day
 1969 Gary Wallis
 1968 Rodney Pope
 1967 Trevor Hughes
 1966 Robert Day
 1965 Robert Day
 1964 Rodney Pope
 1963 Jeff Bray
 1962 Neil Kerley
 1961 Neil Kerley
 1960 Jeff Bray
 1959 Neil Kerley
 1958 Neil Kerley
 1957 Ron Benton (Magarey Medal winner)
 1956 Stan Costello and Aldo Rossetto
 1955 Glynn Williams
 1954 Colin Brown
 1953 Colin Brown
 1952 Jack Lynch
 1951 Brian Faehse
 1950 Brian Faehse
 1949 James Coad
 1948 Colin Brown
 1947 Bernie Smith
 1946 Garth Burkett
 1945 Garth Burkett

References

External links
West Adelaide Football Club History
Brooke Fogden

Australian rules football awards
Australian rules football-related lists